The Cuban flower bat (Phyllonycteris poeyi), also called Poey's flower bat, is a species of bat in the family Phyllostomidae. It is found on the Caribbean islands of Cuba and Hispaniola (in both Haiti and the Dominican Republic).

Description
The males are significantly larger than the females. Both sexes have silky, uniformly greyish-white fur. The snout is relatively long and narrow and bears a simple, rather rudimentary, nose leaf. The tongue is also long, with a hairlike structures forming a brus at the top, which helps the bat to feed on nectar from flowers.

Unlike other related bats, their echolocation calls are typically less than 50 kHz, and relatively long, lasting up to 7 seconds. In more enclosed spaces, like many bats, the calls are modified to shorter, frequency modulated sounds.

Distribution and habitat
The Cuban flower bat is endemic to Cuba, Hispaniola, Isla de la Juventud, and surrounding smaller islands. On Hispaniola, it has been reported from both Haiti and the Dominican Republic. There are two generally recognised subspecies, although these are sometimes considered to be wholly separate species:

 Phyllonycteris poeyi poeyi - Cuba and Isla de la Juventud
 Phyllonycteris poeyi obtusa - Hispaniola

Behaviour and ecology
Like most bats, the Cuban flower bat is nocturnal. It spends the day in colonies of several thousand individuals in narrow, blind-ending cave galleries. Such caves are often shared with other species of bat, including the Cuban fruit-eating bat, the buffy flower bat and various moustached bats. During the night, Cuban flower bats feed primarily on seeds and flower pollen from a wide range of plants, although they do also eat some flying insects. They are typically gregarious animals, flying in groups of up to thirty individuals during the night. The main predators of Cuban flower bats include barn owls, stygian owls, and Cuban boas.

Females come into oestrus once a year, probably around December. The gestation period is unknown, but is likely to be around six months.

References

Phyllonycteris
Mammals described in 1860
Taxonomy articles created by Polbot
Bats of the Caribbean
Mammals of the Dominican Republic
Mammals of Cuba
Mammals of Haiti